Selena Jane Malijarri Uibo (born 25 March 1985) is an Australian politician. She is a Labor member of the Northern Territory Legislative Assembly since 2016, representing the electorate of Arnhem.

Early life and career
Uibo was born in the Northern Territory. Her mother is a Nunggubuyu woman from Numbulwar and Wanindilyakwa from Groote Eylandt both located in south-east Arnhem Land. Her father was born in Sydney. She went to school in Batchelor and Darwin and participated in many youth programs including the Aboriginal Islander Tertiary Aspirations Program, YMCA Youth Parliament and the National Youth Round Table.

Uibo graduated valedictorian from the University of Queensland with a Bachelor of Arts and Bachelor of Education (Secondary) in 2010.  She began her teaching career at the Casuarina Senior College before moving to Numbulwar in 2012, where she was acting senior teacher.

In 2013 she won a Commonwealth Bank Foundation award for teaching financial literacy to her secondary students. Uibo also won the NT Award for Excellence in Teaching or Leadership in Aboriginal and Torres Strait Islander Education in both the Arnhem region and the Northern Territory.

Politics

|}
Uibo was elected into the Northern Territory Legislative Assembly in 2016 in the electoral division of Arnhem, previously held by Larisa Lee.  She won the seat on 64 percent of the two-party vote, reverting Arnhem to its traditional status as a safe Labor seat.  Lee, who served under three different banners during her tenure (Country Liberal, independent, Palmer United and independent again), won only 117 votes.  Meanwhile, Uibo won 54 percent of the primary vote, enough to reclaim the seat for Labor without the need for preferences.

In a reshuffle of the Gunner Ministry on 26 June 2018, Uibo was promoted to the Cabinet of the Northern Territory as Minister for Education and Minister for Training.

On 31 January 2019, Uibo was additionally sworn in as Minister for Aboriginal Affairs.

The fourth Gunner ministry was announced on 7 September 2020, following the 2020 Northern Territory general election. Uibo continued as Minister for Aboriginal Affairs, and was appointed Attorney-General and Minister for Justice, Minister for Treaty and Local Decision Making, and Minister for Parks and Rangers.

References

1985 births
Living people
Members of the Northern Territory Legislative Assembly
Australian Labor Party members of the Northern Territory Legislative Assembly
Indigenous Australian politicians
Women members of the Northern Territory Legislative Assembly
University of Queensland alumni
21st-century Australian politicians
21st-century Australian women politicians